Caroline Edelstam (born 2 September 1975 in Trelleborg, Sweden) is a non-profit executive, currently a board member of the Harald Edelstam Foundation (also known as the Edelstam Foundation) and Chair of the Prize Jury for the Edelstam Prize, both of which she co-founded. She also founded the Edelstam Institute of Education for Human Rights and International Affairs of which she is the Executive Director. Harald Edelstam was her grandfather.

She is currently a board member of the foundation Help to Help and the association Ordfront.

She graduated in 1995 from the Institutet för Internationell Utbildning after study at London South Bank University and the Paris Chamber of Commerce, and in 2000 graduated from the American University in Paris after studying International Corporate Communications, Art History, Cities: Architecture and Urban Culture, and European Cultural Studies.

During 2014, Edelstam was the Director of Fundraising at Ersta diakoni. From 2009 to 2011, Edelstam was the Secretary General for the African Medical and Research Foundation (AMREF) in Sweden. Before that she worked as a consultant for Burson-Marsteller. She has also worked for a number of non-profit organizations, including the Salvation Army, the Swedish Microcredit Foundation and Min Stora Dag, and from 2008 to 2010 was a member of the editorial board for the magazine of the Swedish Fundraising Council, Giva Sverige.

For her work at AMREF, the Swedish business magazine CSR i Praktiken ranked Edelstam among the 100 individuals likely to have the most influence on organisations in the business, service and non-profit sectors during 2011.

Edelstam was nominated to the Martin Luther King-Priset in 2013 and awarded the Condor Prize in 2012 as the "Swede of the Year", within the category "Institutional Work". Edelstam lives in Stockholm.

References

External links
 Uruguay Mujica-firma-apoyo-para-Premio-Harald-Edelstam
 Mujica, Uruguay's President meets Caroline Edelstam and gives his support for The Edelstam Prize. Swedish Embassy in Argentina, March 7 2011
 Edelstam Institute
 Edelstam Foundation

Living people
1975 births
People from Trelleborg